Feroniola is a genus of beetles in the family Carabidae, containing the following species:

 Feroniola bradytoides (Fairmaire, 1889)
 Feroniola famelica Tschitscherine, 1900
 Feroniola kulti Straneo, 1952
 Feroniola laticollis (Solier, 1849)
 Feroniola minor Straneo, 1967
 Feroniola reichardti Straneo, 1995
 Feroniola subamaroides (Rousseau, 1900)
 Feroniola subsinuata Straneo, 1967
 Feroniola zischkai Straneo, 1952

References

Pterostichinae